Varun Khandelwal  is an Indian television actor. He has played roles in many serials like Bhabhi, Kahaani Ghar Ghar Kii, Jyoti, Yahaaan Main Ghar Ghar Kheli, Diya Aur Baati Hum and "Sajan Ghar Jaana Hai".

Television

Movies
 Zoop in India
 Main Aur Mr. Riight

References

External links
Actor's blog

Living people
Indian male soap opera actors
Male actors in Hindi television
Year of birth missing (living people)